William S. Hart High School is a four-year public high school in the neighborhood of Newhall in the city of Santa Clarita, California, United States. Founded in 1945, it is the oldest high school in the Santa Clarita Valley. Named for local cowboy actor William S. Hart, it is part of the William S. Hart Union High School District.

Student demographics
As of the 2021-22 academic year, 2,146 students were enrolled at Hart High School. 57.3% of students were Hispanic, 32.0% were non-Hispanic white, 5.6% were Asian American, and 1.3% were African American. As of 2020-21, 844 students (39.2%) were eligible for free or reduced-price lunch.

Activities
Hart High School was formerly the host of the Hart Invitational Quiz Bowl, a quiz bowl competition for teams from Los Angeles, Orange, Riverside, and San Bernardino counties. Lori Huenink coached the quiz bowl team for 21 years from 1974 to 1995.

Mascot controversy
Hart High School's mascot has been an Indian since the school's foundation in 1945. In June 2020, some students urged principal Jason d'Autremont to discontinue the mascot, which they characterized as outdated and offensive. An online petition to change the mascot gathered thousands of signatures. D'Autremont, with help from the Santa Clarita City Council, acted on these complaints.

In a student survey conducted on March 12, 2021, 49% of students favored keeping the mascot, 26% favored changing it, and 25% had no preference. On July 14, 2021, the board of the William S. Hart Union High School District voted 4-1 to retire the mascot by 2025.

Notable alumni

 Trevor Bauer, MLB pitcher for the Los Angeles Dodgers 
 Kyle Boller, NFL quarterback, Baltimore Ravens 20032007, St. Louis Rams 2009, Oakland Raiders 201011, signed by San Diego Chargers in 2012, retired; married to former Miss California Carrie Prejean
 Trevor Brown,  MLB catcher, San Francisco Giants
 Laura Diaz, KTTV journalist  
 Anthony Ervin, 4-time Olympic gold medalist swimmer and 2-time world champion
 Tyler Glasnow, MLB pitcher, Tampa Bay Rays
 Mark-Paul Gosselaar, actor on Saved by the Bell and NYPD Blue
 Steve Borden, professional wrestler Sting 
 Delano Howell, NFL strong safety, Buffalo Bills 2012, Indianapolis Colts 201314
 Darryl Ingram, NFL tight end for Minnesota Vikings, Cleveland Browns, and Green Bay Packers
 Joe Kapp, NFL and CFL quarterback, led Minnesota Vikings to Super Bowl IV
 Gary Lockwood, actor, played astronaut Frank Poole in 2001: A Space Odyssey
 Andrew Lorraine, MLB pitcher
 Kevin Millar, professional baseball first baseman, analyst for MLB Network and New England Sports Network
 Mike Montgomery, MLB pitcher for 2016 World Series champion Chicago Cubs
 Matt Moore, NFL quarterback for Miami Dolphins and backup quarterback for Kansas City Chiefs in Super Bowl LIV 
 Dee Dee Myers, political analyst, press secretary to President Bill Clinton (January 1993December 1994), consultant on The West Wing
 Micah Ohlman, KTLA News Anchor
 Jerry Owens, MLB outfielder for Chicago White Sox, wide receiver for UCLA
 Tyler Posey, actor on MTV's Teen Wolf
 Kyle Reynish, professional soccer player for the Chicago Fire
 James Shields, MLB starting pitcher for Chicago White Sox, formerly of San Diego Padres (20142016), Kansas City Royals (201314) and Tampa Bay Rays (20062012)
 Juliet Sorci, actress in the TV movie A Mom for Christmas
 Chris Valaika, MLB infielder, Cincinnati Reds 20102012, Miami Marlins 2013, Chicago Cubs 2014; coach
 Pat Valaika, MLB infielder, Baltimore Orioles
 Bob Walk, former MLB pitcher, nicknamed "The Whirly Bird", Philadelphia Phillies 1980, Atlanta Braves 1981–1983, and Pittsburgh Pirates 1984–1993
 Todd Zeile, former MLB infielder for St. Louis Cardinals, Los Angeles Dodgers and other teams

Notable faculty
Film composer Paul Hertzog formerly worked at Hart as the AP Music Theory teacher. Hertzog also taught 10th-grade Honors English.

References

External links

Public high schools in California
High schools in Santa Clarita, California
1945 establishments in California
Educational institutions established in 1945